droidcon is the franchise name for a series of commercial conferences in Europe, focused on software development for Google's Android smartphone framework. The droidcon conferences are the largest Android developer conferences held outside the USA.

droidcon started in 2009 in Berlin, as a grassroots effort organized by Android developers.  It grew continuously and by 2015 was held in 19 countries. So far droidcon conferences took place in Berlin, London, Tunis, Bangalore, Bucharest, Amsterdam, Murcia, Brussels, Turin, Paris, Madrid, Stockholm, Tel Aviv, Moscow, Kraków, Dubai, Zagreb, Thessaloniki, Montreal and New York. Two of the largest droidcon events held so far were in London in 2014 and Berlin in 2013, with about 1000 attendees each. The conferences continue to grow in size and in new locations.2019 Droidcon edition is set to happen at [Chennai]. 

droidcon provides a forum for developers to network with other developers, to share techniques, to announce apps and products, and to learn and teach. The conferences open with a "bar-camp" - 5-minute presentations on topics by potential speakers. The audience votes on presentations that they'd like to see in expanded form, and these are scheduled for later in the event.

In 2010, Lucasfilm claimed the rights to the word "droid" based on its Star Wars franchise, and issued a "cease and desist" writ against droidcon. However, as of 2014, the conferences continue to be called "droidcon".

References 

International conferences
Android (operating system) software
Mobile software development
Software development events